"Ain't No Justice" is a song recorded by Canadian country music artist Greg Hanna. It was released in 1997 as Hanna's third single. It peaked at number 10 on the RPM Country Tracks chart in November 1997.

Chart performance

Year-end charts

References

1997 songs
1997 singles
Greg Hanna songs
Songs written by Kim Tribble